Campi Bisenzio is a comune (municipality) in the Metropolitan City of Florence in the Italian region Tuscany, located about  northwest of Florence.

History
The word Campi in the municipality's name stems from the fields which are widespread in the lands around the town. The current name of Campi Bisenzio was assumed only in 1862, with the addition of the name of the Bisenzio river that runs through the town.

Campi Bisenzio is the place where the internal combustion engine was built for the first time by Felice Matteucci and father Eugenio Barsanti.

A number of Renaissance artworks from the church of Sant'Andrea a San Donnino are housed in its adjacent museum.
The church of Santa Maria a Campi Bisenzio still maintains many of its original artworks.

Twin towns 

 Coatbridge, Scotland, United Kingdom
 Bir Lehlou, Western Sahara

References

External links

 Official website

Cities and towns in Tuscany